Midnight Snack may refer to:
 A midnight snack, a small late night meal
 "Midnight Snack" (Robot Chicken), a 2005 episode of Robot Chicken
 Midnight Snack (album), a 2015 album by Homeshake
 The Midnight Snack, a 1941 Tom and Jerry cartoon